Zwane is a South African surname that may refer to
Arthur Zwane (born 1973), South African football midfielder 
Japhet Zwane (born 1974), South African football winger
Mandla Zwane (born 1973), South African football player 
Mosebenzi Zwane, South African Minister of Mineral Resources 
Siyanda Zwane (born 1985), South African football player
Themba Zwane (born 1989), South African football midfielder